The 1974 New Brunswick general election was held on November 18, 1974, to elect 58 members to the 48th New Brunswick Legislative Assembly, the governing house of the province of New Brunswick, Canada. It saw Richard Hatfield's Progressive Conservative Party of New Brunswick win its second majority government with a gain of one seat despite losing the popular vote to Robert J. Higgins's New Brunswick Liberal Party. For the second election in a row, the Conservatives received a majority in the parliament despite receiving fewer votes than the Liberals.

Despite the Hatfield government's involvement in the failed Bricklin SV-1 automobile plant and a series of kickback schemes, there were few surprises during the campaign. Hatfield had made inroads in the Acadian community since the 1970 election, winning three francophone seats in by-elections. The Acadian support proved key during Hatfield's entire term as premier.

This was the first New Brunswick election in which candidates contested only single-member ridings, established as a result of the 1973 electoral redistribution; previous elections had each county as an electoral district electing a varying number of members, based on their respective populations, with multi-member districts predominating.

Results

|- bgcolor=CCCCCC
!rowspan="2" colspan="2"|Party
!rowspan="2"|Party leader
!rowspan="2"|# ofcandidates
!colspan="4"|Seats
|- bgcolor=CCCCCC
|align="center"|1970
|align="center"|Dissolution
|align="center"|Elected
|align="center"|Change
|align="center"|#
|align="center"|%
|align="center"|% Change

|align=left|Progressive Conservative
|align=left|Richard Hatfield
|align="right"|58
|align="right"|32
|align="right"|32
|align="right"|33
|align="right"|+1
|align="right"|145,304
|align="right"|46.86
|align="right"|-1.54

|align=left|Liberal
|align=left|Robert Higgins
|align="right"|58
|align="right"|26
|align="right"|26
|align="right"|25
|align="right"|-1
|align="right"|147,372
|align="right"|47.53
|align="right"|-1.08

|align=left|New Democratic
|align=left|Albert Richardson
|align="right"|35
|align="right"|0
|align="right"|0
|align="right"|0
|align="right"|0
|align="right"|9,092
|align="right"|2.93
|align="right"|+0.10

|align=left|Parti Acadien
|align=left|Euclide Chaisson
|align="right"|13
|align="right"|0
|align="right"|0
|align="right"|0
|align="right"|0
|align="right"|3,607
|align="right"|1.16
|align="right"|
|-

|align=left|Independents
|align=left|
|align="right"|11
|align="right"|0
|align="right"|0
|align="right"|0
|align="right"|0
|align="right"|4,723
|align="right"|1.52
|align="right"|
|-
|}

References

Further reading
 

1974 elections in Canada
Elections in New Brunswick
1974 in New Brunswick
November 1974 events in Canada